Benton Central Junior-Senior High School is the only high school in Benton County, Indiana, and is located five miles southeast of Fowler in Atkinson.  The school mascot is the Bison.  BC was a 1960s consolidation of Ambia, Boswell, Earl Park, Fowler, Freeland Park, Montmorenci, Pine Township, Oxford, Otterbein, and Wadena schools.  The number of elementary schools sending students to Benton Central has declined steadily since then, and only two are left.  The first graduating class (1969) selected by vote the mascot, colors, and school name (choices were Benton Central or Benton Prairie).

Activities

Benton Central encourages its students to be involved by offering several choices in sports, clubs, activities, and vocational classes. Boys sports include football, soccer, cross-country, wrestling, basketball, swimming, track and field, baseball, tennis, and golf. Girls sports include soccer, cross-country, basketball, swimming, track & field, softball, tennis, golf, and volleyball.

The arts department has a variety of offerings including several visual arts classes, Choir, Band, Music History, and Music Theory. In addition to band classes, the Band Department also offers extra-curricular Marching Band, Jazz Band, Pep Band, & Color Guard programs. The Theater department presents two plays a year, a Senior High play in the spring and Junior High in the fall. Creative writing is also emphasized through an annual publication of a literary magazine named The Phoenix.

Other activities at Benton Central include: Academic Teams, Anime Art Club, Outdoors Club, B.C. Courage, C.A.A.P., Cheerleading, Rhythmettes Dance Team, Chess Club, FCA, FFA, French Club, Friends of Rachel Club, Guitar Club, Helping Hands, National Honor Society, Spanish Club, Speech & Debate, Student Council, Super High Mileage Challenge, B.C. Media Team, Ultimate Frisbee, & Yearbook.

The school is administered by the Benton Community School Corporation.

Notable alumni
Charles F. Conner, former United States Deputy Secretary of Agriculture
Neal Musser, former MLB player for the New York Mets, Arizona Diamondbacks, Kansas City Royals and Houston Astros
Dick Atha, (Otterbein High alumnus) former NBA player for the New York Knicks and the Detroit Pistons. Member of the Indiana Basketball Hall of Fame

See also
 List of high schools in Indiana

References

External links

 Benton Community School Corporation

Public high schools in Indiana
Schools in Benton County, Indiana
Public middle schools in Indiana
1968 establishments in Indiana